Olde Wolbers is a surname. Notable people with the surname include:

 Christian Olde Wolbers (born 1972), Belgian musician, songwriter, and producer
 Saskia Olde Wolbers (born 1971), Dutch artist